The 2016 FINA Men's Youth Water Polo World Championships was held in Montenegro from 26 August to 3 September.

Qualified teams

Preliminary round

Group A

Group B

Group C

Group D

Play-off

Match 1

Match 2

Match 3

Match 4

Knockout stage

Placement matches

5th-8th places

9th-12th places

13th-19th places

16-19th places

Final ranking

External links
Official website
FINA website

2016 in Montenegrin sport
International water polo competitions hosted by Montenegro